Jürgen Dethloff (12 May 1924 in Stettin – 31 December 2002) was a German inventor and engineer.

Achievements 
Together with German inventor Helmut Gröttrup he invented the smart card (chip card). A successor of the original chip is now used in tens of millions of credit cards.

Patent 
Dethloff and Gröttrup filed an application for a patent on 13 Sep 1969. However, the patent was only granted on 1 April 1982.

"Einrichtung zur Durchführung von Bearbeitungsvorgängen mit wenigstens einem Identifikanden und einer Vorrichtung", Patentschrift DE-2760486C2

Awards 
 1997: Rudolf-Diesel-Medaille

References

External links 
 Jürgen Dethloff, inventor gallery by Deutsches Patent- und Markenamt
 Alles auf eine Karte, NDR, 30 May 2011

20th-century German inventors
20th-century German engineers
Engineers from Szczecin
1924 births
2002 deaths
People from the Province of Pomerania
Officers Crosses of the Order of Merit of the Federal Republic of Germany